Inkwazi is a Boeing Business Jet (BBJ / Boeing 737) aircraft used as the air transportation for the President of South Africa and operated by 21 Squadron South African Air Force. It has seating for six ministers and ten significant others. It cost R300m to acquire and another R108m to fit and decorate the interior which can seat up to 15 passengers. The jet's name means "fish eagle" in Zulu.

Replacement Tender 
In November 2015, Armscor, tendered for the replacement of the Boeing 737 aircraft. The cost of the new aircraft could range from R2-billion to R4-billion. Some of the specific set of criteria include, a range of 13,800 km, seating for 30 passengers, a conference room for 8, and a private bedroom and bathroom suite.

The potential replacements include:

 The Airbus A330
 The Airbus A340
 The Boeing 777
 The Boeing 787

In October 2016 Armscor announced, "none of the bids achieved a full score satisfactorily in the overall evaluation, thus prompting the cancellation of the tender." The company said it was reviewing the tender process and will continue to search for a replacement.

Current arrangement 
The current aircraft is still used for regional trips. However when the ageing aircraft has been grounded for repairs, other private aircraft have been chartered. When an intercontinental aircraft with a range of 13,300 km is needed, an aircraft has been leased from Fortune Air for almost R2m a month.  The aircraft was back into service as of 2018.

References

See also
 21 Squadron SAAF
 Air transports of heads of state and government

Presidential aircraft
Boeing 737
Presidents of South Africa
South African military aircraft
Individual aircraft